The following article outlines statistics for UEFA Euro 2016, which took place in France from 10 June to 10 July 2016. Goals scored during penalty shoot-outs are not counted, and matches decided by a penalty shoot-out are considered draws.

Goalscorers

Assists

Clean sheets
4 clean sheets

 Manuel Neuer
 Rui Patrício

3 clean sheets

 Thibaut Courtois
 Hugo Lloris
 Gianluigi Buffon

2 clean sheets

 Łukasz Fabiański
 David de Gea
 Yann Sommer
 Wayne Hennessey

1 clean sheet

 Etrit Berisha
 Robert Almer
 Danijel Subašić
 Joe Hart
 Gábor Király
 Michael McGovern
 Wojciech Szczęsny
 Darren Randolph
 Matúš Kozáčik
 Volkan Babacan

Awards

Golden Boot
Antoine Griezmann of France received the Golden Boot award as the top scorer of the tournament with six goals, the most for a player at a single tournament since countryman Michel Platini scored nine in 1984.

Man of the Match

Scoring
Overview

Timing

Teams

Individual

Attendance
Overall attendance: 2,427,303
Average attendance per match: 
Highest attendance: 76,833 – France vs Iceland
Lowest attendance: 28,840 – Russia vs Wales

Wins and losses

Discipline

Summary

Sanctions

By match

By referee

By team

By individual

Overall statistics

Notes

References

External links
 UEFA Euro 2016 statistics at Union of European Football Associations

Statistics
2016